Jaromír Nečas (17 November 1888 in Nové Město na Moravě, Margraviate of Moravia – 30 January 1945 in Merthyr Mawr) was a Czechoslovak politician. He was one of the leading figures in the Social Democratic Workers' Party in Subcarpathian Rus'. He was elected to the Czechoslovak National Assembly in 1924 and 1925 from the Užhorod constituency (which had nine parliamentary seats), as a candidate of the joint list of the Subcarpatian and Czechoslovak social democratic parties.

References

1888 births
1945 deaths
People from Nové Město na Moravě
People from the Margraviate of Moravia
Social Democratic Workers' Party in Subcarpathian Rus' politicians
National Labour Party (1938) politicians
Members of the Chamber of Deputies of Czechoslovakia (1920–1925)
Members of the Chamber of Deputies of Czechoslovakia (1925–1929)
Members of the Chamber of Deputies of Czechoslovakia (1929–1935)
Members of the Chamber of Deputies of Czechoslovakia (1935–1939)
Czechoslovak emigrants to the United Kingdom
Government ministers of the Czechoslovak government-in-exile